Kamakhkhi Prasad Chattopadhyay (27 March 1917 - 30 May 1976) was an Indian poet. His father Basanta kumar Chattopadhyay served as the first auditor general of independent India.

Education
Kamakhkhi passed his BA exam and awarded Bankim puroshkar for being first in the BA exam.

Career
He works as the assistant of Sudhindra Nath Dutta in Damodar valley corporation. He spent most of his job life in Mumbai, Delhi and Moscow. He stayed in Moscow for 3 years. During his Moscow life he translated Russian books into Bengali. He was a photographer also. He was editor of the children magazine Rangmashal.

Notable work
Some of his notable books are Mainak, Eka, Chayamurti, Shetchakra, Sonar Kopat, Shoshane Bosonto, Ghanashamer ghora, Paruldi etc. Some of his work published under the name Krittibas Ojha.

References

Bengali male poets
1917 births
1976 deaths
 Writers from Kolkata